Humphrey Foulkes (1673–1737) was a Welsh priest and antiquarian.

Life
Foulkes was the son of David Foulkes from Llannefydd in Denbighshire, North Wales.  Foulkes studied at Jesus College, Oxford, obtaining his Bachelor of Arts degree in 1695 and his Master of Arts in 1698; he later obtained a Doctorate of Divinity (1720). Ordained in 1700, he held the living of St George in Denbigshire in 1702, later becoming prebend of Llanfair at St Asaph Cathedral (1705).  In 1709, he became rector of Marchwiel, Denbighshire, and sinecure rector of Llanfor, Merionethshire in 1713.  In addition to his church duties, he wrote on life in Wales in the Middle Ages and corresponded with Edward Lhuyd on various topics of mutual interest.

References

1673 births
1737 deaths
18th-century Welsh Anglican priests
Alumni of Jesus College, Oxford
Welsh antiquarians